Wola Zaradzyńska  is a village in the administrative district of Gmina Ksawerów, within Pabianice County, Łódź Voivodeship, in central Poland.

The village has a population of 450.

References

Villages in Pabianice County